A lumberjack is a worker in the logging industry.

Lumberjack, lumberjacks or The Lumberjack may also refer to:

Arts, entertainment and media

Film
 Lumberjack (film), a 1944 American film directed by Lesley Selander

Literature 
Lumberjack (1974), a book written and illustrated by Canadian artist William Kurelek, about his days working in a logging camp
 The Lumberjack (newspaper), a Humboldt State University newspaper
 The Lumberjack, a Northern Arizona University newspaper

Music
 Lumberjacks (group), the hip hop duo between rappers T-Mo and Khujo
 "Lumberjack" (1960), a song by Johnny Cash on his album Ride This Train (1960)
 "The Lumberjack" (Hal Willis song), a song by Hal Willis
 "The Lumberjack" (Jackyl song), a song by Jackyl
 "Lumberjack" (song), a 2021 song by Tyler, the Creator

Sports
 Bangor Lumberjacks, a former baseball team based in Bangor, Maine, U.S.
formerly known as Adirondack Lumberjacks
 Cleveland Lumberjacks, a former ice hockey team based in Ohio, U.S.
Covington Lumberjacks, a collegiate summer baseball team in Virginia, U.S.
East Bay Lumberjacks, a baseball team based in Oakland, California, U.S.
 Granite City Lumberjacks, a junior ice hockey team based in Sauk Rapids, Minnesota, U.S.
Hearst Lumberjacks, a junior ice hockey team from Ontario, Canada
Maine Lumberjacks, a former U.S. minor league basketball team
 Muskegon Lumberjacks, a junior ice hockey team from Michigan, U.S.
Muskegon Lumberjacks (1984–1992)
Muskegon Lumberjacks (1992–2010)
Philadelphia Lumberjacks, a former American basketball team 
 The Portland LumberJax, a former lacrosse team based in Portland, Oregon
Vermont Lumberjacks, a junior ice hockey organization from Burlington, U.S.
The Yukon Lumberjacks, a former professional wrestling tag team
Wausau Lumberjacks, a former baseball team based in Wisconsin, U.S.

Students and athletic teams nicknamed lumberjacks
Dakota College at Bottineau, North Dakota, U.S.
Humboldt State Lumberjacks, California, U.S.
Northern Arizona Lumberjacks, Arizona, U.S.
Stephen F. Austin Lumberjacks and Ladyjacks, Texas, U.S.

Other uses
 Operation Lumberjack, a military operation near the end of World War II
 Lumberjack, a troop from the mobile game Clash Royale

See also

 Lumberjack breakfast, a hearty full breakfast said to originate in Canada
 "The Lumberjack Song", by Monty Python: "I'm a lumberjack and I'm okay / I sleep all night and I work all day"
 Lumberjack 100, an ultra-endurance mountain bike race
 Lumberjack match, a type of professional wrestling match
 Lumberjack World Championship
 Lumberjack Steam Train, a passenger excursion train operated by the Laona and Northern Railway
 Lumberjack Man, 2015 film
 Lumberjack Band, a marching band who played at Green Bay Packers games
Urban lumberjacking
Timberjack (disambiguation)